Charles M. Kerins (December 7, 1915 – January 1988) is an American illustrator and painter.

Education
He graduated from the Massachusetts College of Art and Northeastern University.  Kerins studied under sculptor Cyrus Dallin who had a profound effect on the artist's attention to anatomy in his paintings.

Career
Kerins chronicled the idealized American dream of the 1950s and 1960s in paintings which appeared as covers for Boston Red Sox Yearbooks, Converse Yearbooks, Catholic Boy magazine and ads in the Saturday Evening Post, Life, Look, and National Geographic magazine. Oil portraits constituted much of his body of work. Portraits include; Wifred L. O'Leary, John F. Kennedy, Richard Cushing, Joseph Martin, Pope John XXIII among others. Kerins' studios were at Scituate, Massachusetts and Pocasset, Massachusetts.

In classical tradition, Kerins worked from live models and used many local people, including a young Mark Goddard of Lost in Space. Working with both Speed Graphic and Polaroid cameras, the artist used photo references as well as life drawings in the creation of his paintings.

Hallmarks of the artist's work are excellent anatomy and dynamic action. Though Kerins style is unique, it is sometimes compared to illustrators Norman Rockwell and Harry Anderson.

Awards
He was named one of America's Top 100 Illustrators by the Chicago Art Directors Club in 1956.

Family
He was twice married. His first wife, Kathryn, mother of his eldest 4 children, was his agent for more than thirty years. Later in life he married Dona and had five more children.

References

External links
 Charles Kerins Website
 Charles Kerins  (1915 – 1988) at AskART.
 Charles Kerins' work at The Illustrated Gallery.

1915 births
1988 deaths
People from Brookline, Massachusetts
American illustrators
20th-century American painters
American male painters
Artists from Massachusetts
Massachusetts College of Art and Design alumni
Northeastern University alumni
People from Scituate, Massachusetts
20th-century American male artists